The 2022 European Cadets and Juniors Fencing Championships (26th) took place in Novi Sad, Serbia, from 26 February to 7 March 2022 and organised by European Fencing Confederation. On 2 March, and following the IOC recommendations, that FIE Executive Committee decided not to invite or allow the participation of Russian and Belarusian athletes and officials in FIE competitions until further notice.

Schedule 
All times are CET (UTC+01:00).

Medalists

Junior

Cadet

Medals table

See also
 2022 Asian Cadets and Juniors Fencing Championships
 2022 World Cadets and Juniors Fencing Championships

References

External links 
 Website
 https://www.fencingtimelive.com/tournaments/eventSchedule/3BAB6182B150494A84D26017BC6224A8#today
 https://www.fencingtimelive.com/tournaments/eventSchedule/1BCE3C2034BB45CAB4B6529663B44FCE#today

Fencing competitions in Serbia
European Junior & Cadet Fencing Championships
European Junior & Cadet Fencing Championships
Sports competitions in Novi Sad
International sports competitions hosted by Serbia
European Junior & Cadet Fencing Championships
European Junior & Cadet Fencing Championships
Fencing competitions